Bowdon Urban District is a former Urban District in Cheshire, based in the village of Bowdon. It was created in 1894 and abolished in 1974 when it was incorporated into the Metropolitan Borough of Trafford.

Established in 1894, the Bowdon urban district became obsolete in 1974.  Some district records are held at the Trafford Local Studies centre. Bowdon has formed part of two Poor Law Unions: Altrincham (1837 to 1895); Bucklow (1895 to 1930).

Districts of England created by the Local Government Act 1894
Districts of England abolished by the Local Government Act 1972
History of Cheshire
Urban districts of England
Former districts of Cheshire